Sevan Ross (born 1951) is a Zen Buddhist priest with training backgrounds in both the Sōtō and Rinzai traditions in the Harada-Yasutani lineage. He is the former spiritual director of the Chicago Zen Center in Evanston, IL.

Ross is an outspoken advocate of Vegetarianism, especially as seen in the context of Zen practice.

See also
Timeline of Zen Buddhism in the United States

External links
 Interview with Sevan Ross for Veggie Dharma

References

Zen Buddhist priests
American Zen Buddhists
Living people
1951 births